The Syrphinae constitute one of the three subfamilies of the fly family Syrphidae. Most larvae of this subfamily feed on aphids. It is a monophyletic group with more than 1,600 species.

Gallery

References

Bugguide,net Subfamily Syrphinae
 Encyclopedia of Life
Zoological Journal of the Linnean Society The phylogeny and systematics of European predacious Syrphidae (Diptera) based on larval and puparial stages
Annual Review of Entomology Bionomics and Physiology of Aphidophagous Syrphidae